Joseph Lynn Nabers (March 31, 1940 – July 31, 2010) was an American politician who served in the Texas House of Representatives from 1969 to 1983.

Nabers was a graduate of Howard Payne University and Baylor University.

He died of cancer on July 31, 2010, in Austin, Texas, at age 70.

References

1940 births
2010 deaths
Democratic Party members of the Texas House of Representatives
Deaths from cancer in Texas
Howard Payne University alumni
Baylor University alumni